Gutasaga (Gutasagan) is a saga regarding the history of Gotland before its Christianization. It was recorded in the 13th century and survives in only a single manuscript, the Codex Holm. It was written in the Old Gutnish language, a variety of Old Norse.

A local creation myth 
The saga begins with Gotland being discovered by a man named Þieluar (Tjalve) (Gutnish: Tjelvar). He was a mythical figure who shows up twice in the Prose Edda and once in Gutasaga. Gotland is under a spell and under water during the day and out of water only during the night, a spell that is broken by Þieluar lighting a fire on the island. Þieluar's son Hafþi (Havde) and his wife Vitastjerna (Gutnish: Hwitastierna; English: White Star) had three sons named Graip, Gute and Gunfjaun, the ancestors of the Gutes. After Havde's and Vitastjerna's first night together, she had a dream about three snakes entwined in her bosom. This was interpreted as a symbol that all things are connected in circles and that they would have three sons. The subject is depicted on some of the picture stones on Gotland.

The saga says that after his father died, Gute was appointed to be the chief, and shall have given his name to both the island and the Gutnish people. They shared Gotland, where Gute held the midsection, Graip the northern and Gunnfjaun the southern part. Gotland was divided in three parts, a division that was reflected in a division of Gotland into three Tredingar (literal thirds), a division that remained legally until 1747 and still remains within the church, which still today retains this division into three Deaneries.

Emigration to southern Europe 
The saga tells of an emigration that is associated with the historical migration of the Goths during the Migration Period:

over a long time, the people descended from these three multiplied so much that the land couldn't support them all. Then they draw lots, and every third person was picked to leave, and they could keep everything they owned and take it with them, except for their land. ... they went up the river Dvina, up through Russia. They went so far that they came to the land of the Greeks. ... they settled there, and live there still, and still have something of our language.

That the Goths should have gone "to the land of the Greeks" is consistent with their first appearance in classical sources: Eusebius of Caesarea reported that they devastated "Macedonia, Greece, the Pontus, and Asia" in 263.

The emigration would have taken place in the 1st century AD, and  loose contact with their homeland would have been maintained for another two centuries, the comment that the emigrant's language "still has something" in common shows awareness of dialectal separation. The events would have needed to be transmitted orally for almost a millennium before the text was written down.

The mention of the Dvina river is in good agreement with the Wielbark culture. Historically, the Goths followed the Vistula, but during the Viking Age, the Dvina-Dniepr waterway succeeded the Vistula as the main trade route to Greece for the Gutes (or Gotar in standard Old Norse), and it is not surprising that it also replaced the Vistula in the migration traditions.

Entry into the Kingdom of Sweden 
The Gutasaga contains several references to the relationship between Gotland and Sweden, and asserts that it is based on mutual agreements, and notes the duties and obligations of the Swedish King and Bishop in relationship to Gotland. It is therefore not only an effort to write down the history of Gotland, but also an effort to assert Gotland's independence from Sweden.

It gives Awair Strabain as the man who arranged the mutually beneficial agreement with the king of Sweden, and the event would have taken place before the end of the 9th century, when Wulfstan of Hedeby reported that the island was subject to the Swedes. (See Consolidation of Sweden)

Modern Gotland 
Tjelvar and several other names of people from the Gutasaga are used for places, establishments and other Gotland related things like websites. A stone ship in Boge is called Tjelvar's Grave. Boge is also the place for the bay Tjäldersvik and the Tjäldersholm island. The Digerrojr cairn in Garde is also known as Graips rojr.

In 2011, a competition, hosted by the Swedish Astronomical Society, for naming a newly discovered Apollo asteroid was held in Visby. It was named 137052 Tjelvar after Tjelvar, the mythological first man to bring fire to the island.

See also 
Norse saga
Geats
Goths
Gotlander

References

External links 
 Original text (based on Gannholm's 1992 edition)
 English translation by Peter Tunstall (2004) (Archived)
 Old Gutnish-English facing-text translation

Sagas
Swedish literature
Sources of Norse mythology
Gutnish
Gotland